Gene Greif (September 11, 1954 – November 27, 2004) was a graphic designer who specialized in creating album cover art.

Greif attended LaGuardia High School of Music and Art and the Cooper Union where he first majored in architecture before graduating with a BFA in graphic design. In 1976, he became an art director for CBS Records where he designed album covers. He began his freelance career in 1983, working for Time, The New York Times, The Washington Post, Fortune, AOL, Time Warner, and Knoll, among others.

Greif died on November 27, 2004, from hepatitis C complications.

References

1954 births
2004 deaths
People from Queens, New York
American graphic designers
Album-cover and concert-poster artists
Fiorello H. LaGuardia High School alumni
Cooper Union alumni